The National LGBT Chamber of Commerce (NGLCC) is a U.S. not-for-profit advocacy group that aims to expand the economic opportunities and advancement of the LGBT business community. Its headquarters are in NW in Washington, D.C.  NGLCC is the exclusive certifying body for LGBT-owned businesses known as LGBT Business Enterprises (LGBTBEs), and advocates for LGBT business inclusion in corporate and government supplier diversity programs. In October 2017, the organization changed its name from the National Gay & Lesbian Chamber of Commerce to National LGBT Chamber of Commerce to better reflect the entire LGBT business community it serves.

Overview
The NGLCC  was co-founded in 2002 by Justin G. Nelson and Chance Mitchell. Nelson has served as president since the NGLCC was founded, and Mitchell has served as CEO over the same period. Their goal was to create an organization that could support LGBT business owners and showcase the diversity of talent in the lesbian, gay, bisexual, and transgender communities. NGLCC provides direct links between businesses, corporate partners, government organizations and other community groups that support LGBT economic opportunity.

In early 2004, NGLCC created a "diversity certification program", making the organization a national third-party certifying body for LGBT-owned businesses.

The NGLCC has a network of more than 50 local, state, and international affiliate LGBT chambers of commerce, and serves to represent their economic interests and opportunities.

The NGLCC offices employ approximately 15 full-time staff. The NGLCC runs an internship and fellowship program to support operations.

NGLCC co-founders Justin G. Nelson and Chance Mitchell also serve on the board of directors. NGLCC senior executives also include Jonathan Lovitz, Sabrina Kent, and Anthony Wisniewski.

In 2017 NGLCC released its first proprietary data, the "America's LGBT Economy Report". Among the findings reported: a typical LGBT business has been in business, on average, for more than 12 years and that LGBT businesses contribute more than $1.7 trillion to the U.S. economy and have created more than 33,000 jobs.

In 2018 and early 2019, as the leading public policy organization on behalf of LGBT-owned businesses, NGLCC won the public sector contracting inclusion of certified LGBTBEs in Orlando, Florida; Nashville, Tennessee; Baltimore, Maryland; Jersey City, New Jersey; and Hoboken, New Jersey, while also advancing statewide bills in New York and New Jersey.  Currently, California, Massachusetts, and Pennsylvania also include certified LGBT-owned businesses, along with major cities like Seattle, Newark, Columbus, and Philadelphia.

Programs

LGBT Business Enterprise (LGBTBE) Certification 
Since 2004, the NGLCC has offered certification to businesses owned by LGBT people. This certification is intended to help corporate and government procurement teams source from LGBT-owned products and services, also known as supplier diversity. As of January 2019, NGLCC has certified 1104 businesses across the United States. Certification in a multi-step process involving an application and supporting documents, a site visit, and final approval before a national certification committee.

In August 2007 the NGLCC signed a memorandum of understanding with the Women's Business Enterprise National Council to provide opportunities for dual-certification as both a women-owned, and lesbian, bisexual or transgender-owned, business. In 2011 the Human Rights Campaign (HRC) began including active sourcing of LGBT certified businesses as part of the Corporate Equality Index, a national directory of gay-friendly workplaces. In 2017, HRC further expanded the index criteria to require LGBT-inclusion in supplier diversity programs as a stand-alone scored metric.

In August 2017 it was announced that the Billion Dollar Roundtable will now include NGLCC certified LGBTs as a category of diverse vendors counted by corporations spending a billion dollars or more on procurement with diversity-owned firms. The Billion Dollar Roundtable was created in 2001 to recognize and celebrate corporations that achieved spending of at least $1 billion with minority and woman-owned suppliers.

Corporate partnerships 
The NGLCC offers corporate membership. Over 300 companies are recognized as corporate partners of the NGLCC. Partnership provides benefits such as access to certified suppliers, recognition as supporters of the LGBT business community and opportunities to share best practice in supplier diversity. The NGLCC recognizes 10 companies as founding corporate members.

 IBM
 Wells Fargo
 JP Morgan Chase & Co
 American Express
 Intel
 Wyndham Worldwide
 American Airlines
 Ernst & Young
 Aetna
 Motorola

NGLCC National Dinner
The NGLCC National Dinner is an annual awards event held in November to celebrate progress in the LGBT business community.

It was first held in 2003 and has been continuously presented at the National Building Museum in Washington, DC. It is attended by businesspeople, LGBT equality advocates, and political figures.

Honors bestowed at the NGLCC National Dinner include: NGLCC/American Airlines ExtrAA Mile Award, Corporation of the Year, Supplier Diversity Advocate of the Year, and LGBT Supplier of the Year.

The NGLCC/American Airlines ExtrAA Mile Award recognizes an LGBT or allied person, persons or organization that have gone the extra mile to support LGBT equality. Previous NGLCC National Dinner Honorees have included: former U.S. Secretary of State Hillary Clinton, NAACP Board Chair Emeritus Julian Bond, tennis legend and LGBT champion Martina Navratilova, former U.S. Secretary of Labor Hilda Solis, actress Judith Light, MSNBC news anchor Thomas Roberts, and NBA player Jason Collins.

NGLCC International Business & Leadership Conference 
Every summer the NGLCC holds the NGLCC International Business and Leadership Conference. The three-day educational conference delivers leadership programming, networking, and engagement opportunities for LGBT business owners and allies. Educational programs include keynote speakers, the annual B2B Boot Camp for certified LGBT Business Enterprises, a chamber development track, marketplace expo, and one-on-one matchmaker meetings. It has previously been held in cities including Washington, DC, Minneapolis, Seattle, Las Vegas (several times), Chicago, Dallas, Fort Lauderdale and Palm Springs.  Over 1,200 people attended the 15th Anniversary 2017 NGLCC Conference in Las Vegas, Nevada.

NGLCC Advocacy milestones

The NGLCC became the first LGBT organization to ring the New York Stock Exchange Closing Bell on June 20, 2005. It rang the bell again on June 5, 2009, and January 10, 2011.

In 2010 the NGLCC began international work (see above), eventually developing into NGLCC Global in 2013.

In November 2011 the NGLCC unveiled a new Supplier Innovation Center covering a second floor in the building that houses their offices. The Supplier Innovation Center is designed to facilitate training opportunities and develop best practice for small businesses, and provide a space for local start-ups to operate. The NGLCC is offering scholarships to LGBT business owners in partnership with the Tuck School of Business at Dartmouth, to be held at the Supplier Innovation Center.

In 2014, AB1678 became the first-in-the-nation public mandate requiring the intentional inclusion of certified LGBT Business Enterprises in contracting with a statewide agency, the California Public Utilities Commission.

In 2015, Massachusetts became the first state to Include certified LGBTBEs in statewide contracting, enacted by Governor Charlie Baker with the guidance of the NGLCC.

In 2016, NGLCC helped introduce the New York State Supplier Diversity Act to intentionally include LGBT, disability, and veteran owned firms in New York State contracting opportunities. That bill, along with a similar bill in New Jersey, are both in process with their respective legislatures.

In 2018 NGLCC's advocacy and public policy team was responsible for the inclusion of certified LGBT Business Enterprises in the cities of Baltimore, Maryland; Jersey City, New Jersey; and Hoboken, New Jersey.  That year the groundwork was laid for similar inclusion legislation to be implemented in Chicago, the District of Columbia, Nashville, Denver, and other major cities.

In 2021, working with the NGLCC's advocacy and public policy team and NGLCC's local affiliate chamber, Three Rivers Business Alliance, the City of Pittsburgh became the first city in Pennsylvania to intentionally create an initiative to expand its inclusion of LGBT-owned businesses in municipal contracting and procurement opportunities.

NGLCC-affiliated chambers
The NGLCC works with more than 50 local, state and international chambers. In 2011, the NGLCC appointed a full-time position to oversee relations with affiliated chambers. The move is considered mutually beneficial to both local chambers and the national chamber.

The NGLCC stopped national membership options in 2011, and all membership is now routed through affiliated chambers. Membership of an affiliated chamber infers membership of the NGLCC. Benefits for membership include a waiver of the fee required for supplier diversity certification. NGLCC corporate partners also offer benefits to members of affiliated chambers.

Relations between affiliated chambers, the NGLCC, and the LGBT business community are overseen by the Affiliate Chamber Council (ACC).

Affiliated US chambers

NGLCC Global

In 2010 the NGLCC hosted the first LGBT trade mission to Argentina, joined by U.S. LGBT businesses. The trade mission met with government officials and business counterparts and formalized relations with the Argentine LGBT Chamber of Commerce. In October 2011 the NGLCC traveled to Bogota to lay the groundwork for a future U.S. certified LGBT trade mission to Colombia.

NGLCC Global, a division of the National LGBT Chamber of Commerce, promotes the growth of small businesses and provides advocacy for broad-based economic advancement and empowerment of the global LGBT community. Through a variety of resources, NGLCC Global connects LGBT-owned and -allied companies, multinational corporations, and international affiliate chamber leaders and members.

In 2016, NGLCC launched NGLCC Global LGBTI Business Week. Hosted by NGLCC in partnership with leaders and organizations committed to expanding global LGBTI economic opportunity, this was the first summit of its kind to converge economic, public policy, and global human rights experts with the goal of shaping a more equitable world for LGBTI citizens. The findings of the week were presented along with awards for top achievement in LGBTI business at the NGLCC National Dinner in Washington, DC, on Friday, November 18, 2016.

NGLCC Global Affiliate Chambers include:

Argentina
 Cámara de Comercio Gay Lésbica Argentina (CCGLAR)
Australia
 Gay and Lesbian Organization of Business and Enterprise (GLOBE)
Canada
 Canadian Gay & Lesbian Chamber of Commerce (CGLCC)
Central & Eastern Europe
 East meets West
Colombia
 Cámara de Comerciantes LGBT de Colombia (CCLGBTco)
Costa Rica
 Cámara de Comercio Diversa Costa Rica (CCDCR)
Dominican Republic
 Cámara de Comercio LGBT de la Republica Dominicana (CCLGBTRD)
Mexico
 Federación Mexicana de Empresarios LGBT (FME-LGBT)
South Africa
 The Other Foundation
Sweden
 Swedish Gay & Lesbian Chamber of Commerce (SGLCC)
Uruguay
 Cámara de Comercio y Negocios LGBT de Uruguay (CCNLGBTU)

Ecuador

 Cámara LGBT de Comercio Ecuador (CCLGBTEC)

References

External links
Official site

LGBT political advocacy groups in the United States
Non-profit organizations based in Washington, D.C.
Organizations established in 2002
2002 establishments in the United States
LGBT business organizations
Chambers of commerce in the United States